Martin Lumbye (born 1 January 1972 in Korea) is a Danish businessman internationally best known for his entrepreneurship and co-partnership in Momondo, a Copenhagen-based travel metasearch engine. After selling Momondo he is now CEO of North-East Venture, an international venture capital fund based in Copenhagen.

Family and early life 
Martin Lumbye was born in 1972 in Korea. He arrived in Denmark in 1974 in the Danish city Horsens where Josephine and Hans Lumbye became his parents. There he grew up with a brother and a sister. After a couple of years they moved to the island of Als. In his late teens he moved to Aarhus to study for the Higher Preparatory Examination (HF) at Langkær Gymnasium & HF followed by studying Humaniora at Aarhus University. He did not finish his studies, because he took a job with the Dr. Dante theater. He lives in Christianshavn in Copenhagen with his girlfriend Louise Linde Bertelsen and he is the father of three daughters.

Early career 
In 1997 Dr. Dante theater headhunted Lumbye to be head of public relations and marketing. Over the years he also took care of public relations and marketing for Granhøj Dans, Mammutteatret, Østre Gasværk Teater, Copenhagen International Ballet and Mungo Park. Six years later, in 2003, he became Secretary-General of the Aarhus Festuge, an art and culture festival in the city of Aarhus. Martin Lumbye held this position until 2006. He retired after criticism of Lumbye having used a pumped up CV and a general lack of qualifications in the cultural field (https://jyllands-posten.dk/jpaarhus/ECE4986741/festugechef-smykker-sig-med-laante-titler/)

Momondo 
In June 2006 he joined a team of four persons to develop and launch a travel metasearch engine named Momondo. Based in Copenhagen they launched Momondo.com in September 2006. It developed into an internationally recognized travel site and was honored in international media like CNN and The Sunday Times. Five years later, in April 2011, he was part of selling Momondo and its parent company Skygate to the British/American company Cheapflights Media Ltd. They were renamed as Momondo Group Ltd. Martin Lumbye continued working for Momondo Group until 2014. In October 2014 the Boston-based private equity fund, Great Hill Partners, acquired a majority stake in Momondo.

Venture Capital fund 
In December 2013 he was part of the launch of the international venture capital fund, North-East Venture, where he is CEO and partner. The parent company of North-East Venture is North-East Family Office. The Danish Growth Fund appointed him in 2013 as chairman of two of its investments - Iconfinder ApS and Billetto ApS. Since January he has also been industrial advisor at Nordic Capital, where he has worked with digital development for companies like Kompan and Sportsmaster.

Boardroom and other roles 
During his career Lumbye has been a member of different boards and had advisor roles in several companies. He has been chairman of the board of the Copenhagen Cooking food festival and Eseebase A/S. He has joined the board in companies like Schmidt Hammer Lassen architects, DYRBERG/KERN and HTM Group. He has been an ambassador of the Red Cross in Denmark since 2005. In 2006 he took part in the 2006 Winter Olympics torch relay in Turin. He has also been a strategic consultant for Danish companies like Georg Jensen, Flügger, SAS Travel Center and Danfoss Universe.

References 

Living people
Danish businesspeople
1972 births